The Rohingya Solidarity Organisation (RSO) is a Rohingya insurgent group and political organisation. It was founded in 1982 following a large scale military operation conducted by the Tatmadaw (Myanmar Armed Forces). The group discontinued its armed rebellion in 1998 but rearmed itself following the 2021 Myanmar coup d'état.

History

1990s 
In the early 1990s, the military camps of the Rohingya Solidarity Organisation (RSO) were located in the Cox's Bazar District in southern Bangladesh. RSO possessed a significant arsenal of light machine-guns, AK-47 assault rifles, RPG-2 rocket launchers, claymore mines and explosives, according to a field report conducted by correspondent Bertil Lintner in 1991.

The military expansion of the RSO resulted in the government of Myanmar launching a massive counter-offensive to expel RSO insurgents along the Bangladesh-Myanmar border. In December 1991, Tatmadaw soldiers crossed the border and accidentally attacked a Bangladeshi military outpost, causing a strain in Bangladeshi-Myanmar relations. By April 1992, more than 250,000 Rohingya civilians had been forced out of northern Rakhine State (Arakan) as a result of the increased military operations in the area.

In April 1994, around 120 RSO insurgents entered Maungdaw Township in Myanmar by crossing the Naf River which marks the border between Bangladesh and Myanmar. On 28 April 1994, nine out of twelve bombs planted in different areas in Maungdaw by RSO insurgents exploded, damaging a fire engine and a few buildings, and seriously wounding four civilians.

On 28 October 1998, the Rohingya Solidarity Organisation merged with the Arakan Rohingya Islamic Front and formed the Arakan Rohingya National Organisation (ARNO), operating in-exile in Cox's Bazar. The Rohingya National Army (RNA) was established as its armed wing.

2000s to 2010s 
One of the several dozen videotapes obtained by CNN from Al-Qaeda's archives in Afghanistan in August 2002 allegedly showed fighters from Myanmar training in Afghanistan. Other videotapes were marked with "Myanmar" in Arabic, and it was assumed that the footage was shot in Myanmar, though this has never been validated. According to intelligence sources in Asia, Rohingya recruits in the RSO were paid a 30,000 Bangladeshi taka (US$525) enlistment reward, and a salary of 10,000 taka ($175) per month. Families of fighters who were killed in action were offered 100,000 taka ($1,750) in compensation, a promise which lured many young Rohingya men, who were mostly very poor, to travel to Pakistan, where they would train and then perform suicide attacks in Afghanistan.

Regional experts in Rakhine State previously disputed the existence of the RSO as an active militant force after the early 2000s. The government of Myanmar blamed the RSO for attacks on border posts in October 2016 until the Arakan Rohingya Salvation Army claimed responsibility.

2021 
Following the 2021 Myanmar coup d'état by the Tatmadaw, the RSO announced its rearmament in March 2021.

The RSO opposes the Arakan Rohingya Salvation Army (ARSA), whom the RSO blames for attacks against Rohingya community leaders in Bangladeshi refugee camps.

References

External links 
 

Rebel groups in Myanmar
Islam in Myanmar
Rakhine State
Insurgency
Islamist groups